Kannata Valley is a resort village in the Canadian province of Saskatchewan within Census Division No. 6. It is on the shores of Last Mountain Lake in the Rural Municipality of Longlaketon No. 219.

History 
Kannata Valley incorporated as a resort village on September 1, 1966.

Demographics 

Government 
The Resort Village of Kannata Valley is governed by an elected municipal council and an appointed administrator that meets on the third Monday of every month. The mayor is Ken MacDonald and its administrator is Darlene Sytnick.

See also 
List of communities in Saskatchewan
List of municipalities in Saskatchewan
List of resort villages in Saskatchewan
List of villages in Saskatchewan
List of summer villages in Alberta

References

External links 

Resort villages in Saskatchewan
Longlaketon No. 219, Saskatchewan
Division No. 6, Saskatchewan